This article shows statistics of individual players for the Osijek football club. It also lists all matches that Osijek played in the 2010–11 season.

First-team squad

Competitions

Overall

Prva HNL

Classification

Results summary

Results by round

Results by opponent

Source: 2010–11 Prva HNL article

Matches

Pre-season

Prva HNL

Croatian Cup

Last updated 6 May 2011Sources: Prva-HNL.hr, Sportnet.hr

Player seasonal records

Competitive matches only. Updated to games played 21 May 2011.

Goalscorers

Source: Competitive matches

Disciplinary record
Includes all competitive matches. Players with 1 card or more included only.

Source: Prva-HNL.hr

Appearances and goals

Source: Prva-HNL.hr

Transfers

In

Out

Loans out

Sources: nogometni-magazin.com

References

External links
 Official website 

Croatian football clubs 2010–11 season
2010